Chattanooga Christian School (CCS) is a Christian, interdenominational coeducational day school located in Chattanooga, Tennessee. It is the largest private school in Hamilton County, Tennessee. The private, college-preparatory school was founded in 1970 and currently sits as the foot of Lookout Mountain on 55+ acres. The school serves families in the Chattanooga area and currently enrolls more than 1,400 students in the Lower School (PreSchool-5th), Middle School (6th-8th), and High School (9th-12th).

History
Organized on February 4, 1970 by a group of parents as Lookout Mountain Christian School Association, the school was incorporated as a Georgia non-profit Corporation on June 30, 1972. As the school grew and expanded to encompass more grade levels, a decision was made to move the school from Lookout Mountain to Chattanooga at its present location and change the name to Chattanooga Christian School, Inc. The move to the present campus was made in 1982. The school grew dramatically over the next 30 years. Chattanooga Christian School is a Christian, interdenominational, coeducational day school. It is a parent-directed school, working through an elected administrative Board of Directors, and accepts students in PreSchool through 12th grades. Chattanooga Christian School is a member of Christian Schools International and is accredited by The Southern Association of Colleges and Schools. Today, the campus on Charger Drive encompasses more than 55 acres of land and multiple buildings. It is the largest private school in Hamilton County, Tennessee. The mission of Chattanooga Christian School is to prepare students to lead and serve with distinction while representing Christ and seeking his Kingdom in all areas of the home, church, society, and culture.

Campus
In 1982, the school moved to its present location, the former site of Ed Wright Chevrolet on South Broad Street. The initial  site was expanded by additional purchases over the years to encompass  and 6 buildings. The section of Broad Street in front of the school was renamed Charger Drive in early 2003.

Academic Facilities
 The PreSchool Building sits right next to the Lower School Playground & Park and features playful spaces for pint-sized students. A separate secured entrance makes pick-up and drop-off easy for parents.
 The Nancy B. Maclellan Building was built in 2018. The 12,000-square-foot building boasts ample natural light and houses the school's 4th- and 5th-grade classrooms as well as the Lower School art room, library, and state-of-the-art STEM lab.
 The Lower School Building includes two wings centered around a courtyard. The building houses kindergarten through 3rd-grade classrooms with easy access to the playground and gym.
 Middle School Building
 High School Building
 Fine Arts Center
 The Learning Center is located in the heart of campus and is specifically designed for 30+ students ages 12-22 with more significant needs. In partnership with Siskin Children's Institute for diagnostic and therapeutic services, the center focuses on work-based learning, independent skills, and individualized academic instruction.
 The Learning Commons
 Tim Fordice Industrial Arts Building
 Multi-Purpose Field (used for Middle School football practice, as well as for the annual Field Day for the Lower School)

Recreational Facilities 

 Lower School Playground & Park
 Mike Fingerle Track & Field
 Salter Gym
 Bosworth Gym
 High School Gym/Upper School Cafeteria
 Open-Air Pavilion
 Hugh Maclellan Tennis Center (Coming Spring 2022)
 David Stanton Field
 Power House
 Covered Athletic Facility
 Visser Field
 Softball Field
 Outdoor Tennis Courts
 Beach Volleyball Court
 Holwerda Courtyard

Additional Campus Buildings 

 Lower School Lunch Pavilion
 The Upper School Commercial Kitchen was completed in 2021and serves nutritious meals at multiple locations throughout campus.
 The Spirit Shop & Cafe sells CCS branded swag and offers an inviting spot for breakfast or lunch. 
 Admissions Building

Extracurricular activities

Athletics
Chattanooga Christian School fields teams in interscholastic competition in baseball, basketball, cheering, cross country, football, golf, soccer, softball, strength & conditioning, swimming, tennis, track and field, volleyball, and wrestling.

The athletic programs are growing steadily every year. A new multi-sport athletic facility was fully completed for the 2015-2016 school year called "The Powerhouse"

Theater department
Chattanooga Christian High School has a large and well-organized theater department. They put on a christian family-friendly musical every fall and spring semester, the fall being the middle school musical and spring being high school. In the past they have done The Music Man, Bye Bye Birdie, Mary Poppins, The King and I, Beauty and the Beast and among other Broadway shows but most recently Meet Me In St. Louis (nominated for seven Spotlight Awards in Nashville, TN, including Best Musical). Also, the middle school has done many musicals, including Annie Jr., Seussical Jr., Once Upon a Mattress, The Lion King Jr. and most recently Peter Pan Jr. The school also offers intensive theater summer programs one being a Regular Musical Theater Camp for younger children and the other being an Advanced Musical Theater Camp for older middle and high school students this program is not only limited to Chattanooga Christian students. Most recently the camps produced Lion King Kids and Thoroughly Modern Millie Jr. The high school theater classes have started to produce spring plays most recently being, Peter and the Starcatcher. These shows are often directed and choreographed by Mary Catherine Schimpf, under the music direction of Kara Funke, with the help of Jamison Shimmel and Heath Austin.

Notable alumni
Ashley Harkleroad, tennis player

References

External links
Chattanooga Christian School

Christian schools in Tennessee
Schools in Chattanooga, Tennessee
Educational institutions established in 1970
Private K-12 schools in Tennessee
1970 establishments in Tennessee